Duitso Paul Malema is a South African politician who has represented the African National Congress (ANC) in the Gauteng Provincial Legislature since 2019. He was elected to his seat in the 2019 general election, ranked 27th on the ANC's provincial party list.

References

External links 
 

African National Congress politicians
Living people
Year of birth missing (living people)
Members of the Gauteng Provincial Legislature
21st-century South African politicians